The 2019 NRL season was the 112th season of professional rugby league in Australia and the 22nd season run by the National Rugby League. The Sydney Roosters became the first team to win back-to-back Premierships since the Brisbane Broncos in 1992–93, and the first to achieve the feat since the unified NRL competition started in 1998.

Teams

The lineup of teams remained unchanged for the 13th consecutive year.

Pre-season

The 2019 pre-season featured the All Stars match held on February 15 at AAMI Park. The 2019 World Club Challenge match saw the NRL premiers Sydney Roosters defeat the Super League champions Wigan Warriors.

Regular season

For the first time, the NRL announced that the entirety of a round of games would be hosted at a single venue, adopting the Super League's Magic Weekend concept. Magic Round took place during Round 9 at Suncorp Stadium.

State of Origin was played in Perth for the first time, with Game 2 of the 2019 series played at Optus Stadium.

Bold – Opposition's Home game
X – Bye
* – Golden point game
Opponent for round listed above margin

Ladder

Ladder progression

Numbers highlighted in green indicate that the team finished the round inside the top 8.
Numbers highlighted in blue indicates the team finished first on the ladder in that round.
Numbers highlighted in red indicates the team finished last place on the ladder in that round.
Underlined numbers indicate that the team had a bye during that round.

Finals series

Parramatta Eels 58 – 0 Elimination Final win over Brisbane Broncos broke the record for the biggest winning margin in Finals history, beating the previous mark of 48 points when Newtown defeated St. George 55 – 7 in the 1944 Semi-finals.

Chart

Grand Final

Player statistics and records
 In Round 5, Cameron Smith surpassed Hazem El Masri's career tally of 2,418 points to become the highest point scorer in NRL history. In Round 17 he played his 400th NRL career game, becoming the first player to ever do so.

The following statistics are as of the conclusion of Round 25.

Top 5 point scorers

Top 5 try scorers

Top 5 goal scorers

Top 5 tacklers

2019 Transfers

Players

Source:

Coaches

References